Bant is a town in Flevoland, the Netherlands.

The term Bant may be in reference to: 
Bant, the diminutive of banter
Bunt (community), an ethnic group of Karnataka, India
 Bant (Omdurman), a neighbourhood in Omdurman, Sudan
Bant, one of the planes from the Shards of Alara block in Magic: The Gathering
BANT - Budget Authority Need Timeline- A lead scoring methodology developed by IBM
 Lake Bant, Wilhelmshaven, Germany
Lake Bant tern colony, a breeding colony of common terns (Sterna hirundo) at Lake Bant (Banter See in German) in the port city of Wilhelmshaven, north-western German

People with the name 
Chris Bant (1881–1949), Australian footballer
Horrie Bant (1882–1957), Australian footballer
Stephen Bant, MP for Liskeard, England
Bant Singh, Indian activist
Bant Singer, pen-name of Charles Shaw, Australian journalist and writer